The Georgia Marble Company was founded in 1884 by Samuel Tate. Tate leased out all the land in Pickens County, Georgia, United States, that contained rich Georgia marble.

Company history

In the 1830s Henry Fitzsimmons established the first marble quarry in Pickens County, which was part of the Murphy Marble Belt.  In 1884, Samuel Tate founded the Georgia Marble Company, and leased out the land for others to use. In 1905 Colonel Sam Tate partnered with Dawson Mathias Caldwell and the two became co-presidents and general managers of the company. The business grew rapidly, until concrete began to replace marble in buildings. In 1969, with business falling, the company was purchased by Jim Walter Corporation. Over the next few decades it changed hands several times, passing through ownership by Kohlberg Kravis Roberts and Company, Hillsborough Holding Corporation, First Chicago Corporation and IMERYS. Finally, in 2003, the dimension stone division of Georgia Marble Company was acquired by Polycor.

Flood 

Notable commissions
 Bok Tower Gardens in Lake Wales, FL. Designed by architect Milton Bennett Medary, features sculpture by Lee Lawrie.
 New York Stock Exchange annex as well as the pediment in it created by John Quincy Adams Ward and carved by the Piccirilli Brothers,<ref> Daneker, Jerome G., "The Romance of Georgia Marble, Thomsen-Ellis Company, Baltimore,  1927 p. 66</ref> 
 Daniel Chester French's  Abraham Lincoln statue in the Lincoln Memorial in Washington, D.C., carved by the Piccirill Brothers, 
 National Air and Space Museum
  East Wing of the National Gallery of Art
 Federal Reserve Bank of Cleveland and Integrity and Security'' allegorical figures by Henry Hering, carved by the Piccirilli Brothers Cleveland, Ohio ca. 1923
 Civic Virtue Triumphant Over Unrighteousness sculpture group and fountain created by sculptor Frederick William MacMonnies and architect Thomas Hastings, and carved by the Piccirilli Brothers.(1922)  
 Buckingham Fountain in Chicago. (1927)
 National McKinley Birthplace Memorial, McKim, Mead and White architects and J. Massey Rhind’s statue of William McKinley, in Niles, Ohio, (1915) 
 Our Lady of Victory Basilica, Emile Ulrich architect, in Lackawanna, New York, (1924)

Marble
The company's mines contain some of the best quality marble, and almost every type of marble found in the USA. The marble, when exposed to the weather tends to become less durable from acid rain. The mine is plentiful and every variety with every size is extractable with machinery, and transported by railroad. Types of marble include crystallized marble, and white sanctuary marble ranging in a variety of colors.

Historic district
Numerous company buildings and Tate community structures are listed on the National Register of Historic Places in the Georgia Marble Company and Tate Historic District.

References

External links 
 
Pickens county marble festival
Beauty in Stone: The Industrial Films of the Georgia Marble Company from the Digital Library of Georgia
Georgia Marble Company Records at the Kennesaw State University Archives.

Companies based in Pickens County, Georgia
Non-renewable resource companies established in 1884
Monumental masonry companies
1884 establishments in Georgia (U.S. state)
Quarries in the United States
Marble